Alain De Carvalho (born 9 June 1953) is a former French racing cyclist. He rode in four editions of the Tour de France between 1978 and 1981.

References

External links
 

1953 births
Living people
French male cyclists
People from Ussel
Sportspeople from Corrèze
Cyclists from Nouvelle-Aquitaine